Chief Rabbi is a title given in several countries to the recognized religious leader of that country's Jewish community, or to a rabbinic leader appointed by the local secular authorities. Since 1911, through a capitulation by Ben-Zion Meir Hai Uziel, Israel has had two chief rabbis, one Ashkenazi and one Sephardi.

Cities with large Jewish communities may also have their own chief rabbis; this is especially the case in Israel but has also been past practice in major Jewish centers in Europe prior to the Holocaust. North American cities rarely have chief rabbis. One exception however is Montreal, with two—one for the Ashkenazi community, the other for the Sephardi.

Jewish law provides no scriptural or Talmudic support for the post of a "chief rabbi." The office, however, is said by many to find its precedent in the religio-political authority figures of Jewish antiquity (e.g., kings, high priests, patriarchs, exilarchs and geonim). The position arose in Europe in the Middle Ages from governing authorities largely for secular administrative reasons such as collecting taxes and registering vital statistics, and for providing an intermediary between the government and the Jewish community, for example in the establishment of the Crown rabbi in several kingdoms of the Iberian Peninsula, the rab de la corte in the Kingdom of Castile or the arrabi mor in the Kingdom of Portugal, likely influenced by the expectations of their Catholic, Eastern Orthodox, and Anglican governments and neighbors. Similarly, in the 19th century there was a Crown rabbi of the Russian Empire.

By country/region

Albania 
 Joel Kaplan (2010–present)

Argentina

Sephardi (Syrian)
 Salomon Benhamu
 Yosef Chehebar

Sephardi
 Isaac Sacca (1997–present)

Ashkenazi
 Gabriel Davidovich (2013–present)

Austria
 Jitzchok ben Mosche von Wien, "Or Sorua" (ca. 1200–1270)
 Yom-Tov Lipmann Heller, "Tosfos Jomtov" (1578–1654)
 Scheftel Horowitz (1561–1619)
 Gerschon "Uliph" Aschkenasi (ca. 1612–1693)
 Samson Wertheimer (1658–1724)
 Mosche Chanoch Berliner (1727–1793)
 Isaak Noah Mannheimer (1824–1865)
 Lazar Horowitz (1828–1868), chief rabbi of Vienna
 Adolf Jellinek (1865–1893)
 Moritz Güdemann (1894–1918)
 Zwi Perez Chajes (1918–1927)
 David Feuchtwang (1933–1936)
 Israel Taglicht (1936), provisional chief rabbi
 Insp. I. Öhler (1946), preacher at the Stadttempel
 Akiva Eisenberg (1948–1983)
 Paul Chaim Eisenberg (1983–2016)
 Arie Folger (July 2016)

Belgium
 Eliakim Carmoly (1832–1839)
 Henri Loeb
 Aristide Astrue
Élie-Aristide Astruc (1866–1879)
 Abraham Dreyfus
 Armand Bloch

Bulgaria
 Gabriel Almosnino (1880–1885)
 Presiado Bakish (1885–1889)
 Shimon Dankowitz (1889–1891)
 Moshe Tadjer (1891–1893)
 Moritz Grünwald (1893–1895)
 Presiado Bakish (1895–1898)
 Moshe Tadjer (1898–1900)
 Mordecai Ehrenpreis (1900–1914)
 M. Hezkeya Shabetay Davidov (1914–1918)
 David Pifano (1920–1925)
 No Chief Rabbi (1925–1945) 
 Asher Hannanel (1945–1949)
 Behor Kahlon (1990–2012)
 Aharon Zerbib (2012–2015)
 Yoel Yifrach (2015–Present)

Colombia

Ashkenazi
 Eliezer Paltiel Roitblatt (1946-1957) 
 Chaim Menachem Bentzion Blumenkrantz (Early 1950s)
 Alfredo Goldschmidt (1974–Present) (appointed 1991)

Sephardi
Miguel Attias (1948-Early 1950)
 David Sharbani (Early 1950s-1978)
 Yehuda Benhamu (1978-1986)
 Yehuda Ari Azancot (1986-2000)
 Shlomo Meir Elharar (2000-2010)
 Avi Amsalem (2010-Dec. 2020)

Chabad
 Yehoshua Rosenfeld (1980–Present)

Cuba
 Meyer Rosenbaum (Son of Isamar of Nadvorna, Elected 1948: left Cuba in 1956, a little more than two years before Fidel Castro came to power in the Revolution)
 Raphael Yair Elnadav (1956–1959)
 Shmuel Szteinhendler current Chief Rabbi of Cuba and regional director for Masorti Judaism in Latin America.

Croatia
 Miroslav Šalom Freiberger (1941–1943)
 Kotel Da-Don (1998–2006) from 2006 rabbi of the Bet Israel community Zagreb
 Luciano Moše Prelević (2006–)

Cyprus
 Arie Zeev Raskin (2005–)

Czech Republic
 Karol Sidon

Denmark 
 Abraham Salomon (1687–1700)
  (1700–1728)
 Marcus David (1729–1739)
 Hirsch Samuel Levy (1741–1775)
  (1778–1793)
 Abraham Gedalia (1793–1827)
 Abraham Wolff (1828–1891)
 David Simonsen (1892–1902, 1919–1920)
 Tobias Lewenstein (1903–1910)
 Max Schornstein (1910–1919)
 Max (Moses) Friediger (1920–1947)
 Marcus Melchior (1947–1969)
 Bent Melchior (1970–1996)
  (1996–2014)
  (2014–)

Ecuador
Menachem Mendel Fried (2022- )

Egypt
 Refael Aharon Ben Shimon (1891–1921)
 Masoud Haim Ben Shimon (1921–1925)
 Chaim Nahum (1925–1960)
 Haim Moussa Douek (1960–1972)

Estonia
 Michael Alony (1995–1996)
 Shmuel Kot (2000–)

The Far East
 Aharon Moshe Kiselev (1937–1949)

Finland
 Simon Federbusch (1931–1940)
  (1946–1951)
 Mika Weiss (1957–1961)
 Shmuel Beeri (1961–1963)
 Mordechai Lanxner (1973–1982)
 Ove Schwartz (1982–1987)
 Lazar Kleinman (–1992)
 Michael Aloni (1995–1996)
 Moshe Edelmann (1999–2012)
  (2012–)

Chabad Lubavitch Chief Rabbi of Finland
 Benyamin Wolff (2003–)

France
 David Sintzheim (1808–1812) 
 Abraham Vita de Cologna (1808–1826) 
 Emmanuel Deutz (1810–1842) 
 Marchand Ennery (1846–1852)
 Salomon Ulmann (1853–1865) 
 Lazare Isidor (1866–1888) 
 Zadoc Kahn (1889–1905) 
 Alfred Lévy (1907–1919) 
 Israël Lévi (1920–1939) 
 Isaïe Schwartz (1939–1952) 
 Jacob Kaplan (1955–1980) 
 René-Samuel Sirat (1981–1987)
 Joseph Sitruk (1987–2008)
 Gilles Bernheim (2009–2013) (elected 22 June 2008, resigned 11 April 2013)
 Haim Korsia (2014–)

Galicia
 Aryeh Leib Bernstein (1778–1786)
 Edgar Gluck
Galicia in Central/Eastern Europe, as a political entity, ceased to exist in 1921; the title of its Chief Rabbi had already been abolished 1 November 1786 as part of the Josephinism Reforms.

Due to its being a center for Jewish scholarship, the Rabbi of Lemberg was traditionally seen as the Rabbi of Galicia in the era prior to World War II.

Greece 
 Elias Barzilai
 Gabriel Negrin

Guatemala
 Meyer Rosenbaum (Son of Isamar of Nadvorna, Later Chief Rabbi of Cuba)

Honduras

 Aaron Lankry

Hong Kong
 Ephraim Mirvis
 Mordecai Avston
 Netanel Meoded

Hungary
Note that this list is not in chronological order.
 Meir Eisenstadt known as the Panim Me'iros (1708–), rabbi of Eisenstadt and author of "Panim Me'irot"
 Alexander ben Menahem
 Phinehas Auerbach
 Jacob Eliezer Braunschweig
 Hirsch Semnitz
 Simon Jolles (1717–?)
 Samson Wertheimer (1693?–1724) (also Eisenstadt and Moravia)
 Issachar Berush Eskeles (1725–1753)
 Joseph Hirsch Weiss—grandfather of Stephen Samuel Wise
 Samuel Kohn
 Simon Hevesi (father of Ferenc Hevesi)
 Ferenc Hevesi
 Moshe Kunitzer a pioneer of the Haskalah movement in Hungary (1828–1837)
 Koppel Reich
 Chaim Yehuda Deutsch
 József Schweitzer
 Robert (Avrohom Yehudoh) Deutsch

Iran

 Yedidia Shofet (1922–1980)
 Uriel Davidi (1980–1994)
 Yosef Hamadani Cohen (1994–2007)
 Mashallah Golestani-Nejad (2007–present)
 Yehuda Gerami (2011-present)

Ireland

 Yitzhak HaLevi Herzog (1921–1937)
 Immanuel Jakobovits (1949–1958)
 Isaac Cohen (1959–1979)
 David Rosen (1979–1984)
 Ephraim Mirvis (1985–1992)
 Shimon Yehudah Harris (1993–1994)
 Gavin Broder (1996–2000)
 Yaakov Pearlman (2001–2008)
 Zalman Lent (acting Chief Rabbi, 2008–present)

The appointment of a new Chief Rabbi of Ireland has been put on hold since 2008.

Israel

The position of chief rabbi of the Land of Israel has existed for hundreds of years. During the Mandatory Period, the British recognized the chief rabbis of the Ashkenazi and Sephardi communities, just as they recognized the Mufti of Jerusalem. The offices continued after statehood was achieved. Haredi Jewish groups (such as Edah HaChareidis) do not recognize the authority of the Chief Rabbinate. They usually have their own rabbis who do not have any connection to the state rabbinate.

Under current Israeli law, the post of Chief Rabbi exists in only four cities (Jerusalem, Tel Aviv, Haifa, and Beersheba). In other cities there may be one main rabbi to whom the other rabbis of that city defer, but that post is not officially the "Chief Rabbi".

Many of Israel's chief rabbis were previously chief rabbis of Israeli cities.

Sephardi
 Moshe Galante (the Younger) (1665–1689)
 Moshe ibn Habib (1689–1696)
 Moshe Hayun
 Abraham ben David Yitzhaki (1715–1722)
 Binyamin Maali 
 Elazar ben Yaacob Nahum (1730–1748)
 Nissim Mizrahi (1748–1754)
 Israel Yaacob Algazy (1754–1756)
 Raphael Samuel Meyuchas (1756–1791)
 Haim Raphael Abraham ben Asher (1771–1772)
 Yom Tov Algazy (1772–1802)
 Moshe Yosef Mordechai Meyuchas (1802–1805)
 Yaacob Moshe Ayash al-Maghrebi (1806–1817)
 Jacob Coral (1817–1819)
 Raphael Yosef Hazzan (1819–1822)
 Yom Tov Danon (1822–1824)
 Salomon Moshe Suzin (1824–1836)
 Yonah Moshe Navon (1836–1841)
 Yehudah Raphael Navon (1841–1842)
 Chaim Abraham Gagin (1842–1848)
 Isaac Kovo (1848–1854)
 Haim Nissim Abulafia (1854–1861)
 Haim David Hazan (1861–1869)
 Avraham Ashkenazi (1869–1880)
 Raphael Meir Panigel (1880–1892)
 Yaacob Shaul Elyashar (1893–1906)
 Yaacob Meir (1906) 
 Eliyah Moshe Panigel (1907–1909)
 Nahman Batito (1909–1911)
 Moshe Franco (1911–1915)
 Haim Moshe Elyashar (1914–1915)
 Nissim Yehudah Danon (1915–1921)
 Yaacob Meir (1921–1939)
 Benzion Uziel (1939–1954)
 Yitzhak Nissim (1955–1973)
 Ovadia Yosef (1973–1983)
 Mordechai Eliyahu (1983–1993)
 Eliyahu Bakshi-Doron (1993–2003)
 Shlomo Amar (2003–2013)
 Yitzhak Yosef (2013–)

Ashkenazi
 Meir Auerbach—Rabbi of Jerusalem (1860–1871)
 Samuel Salant (1871–1909)
 Abraham Isaac Kook (1921–1935)
 Yitzhak HaLevi Herzog (1936–1959)
 Isser Yehuda Unterman (1964–1973)
 Shlomo Goren (1973–1983)
 Avraham Shapira (1983–1993)
 Yisrael Meir Lau (1993–2003)
 Yona Metzger (2003–2013)
 David Lau (2013–)

Military Rabbinate
 Shlomo Goren (1948–1968)
 Mordechai Piron (1968–1977)
 Gad Navon (1977–2000)
 Israel Weiss (2000–2006)
 Avichai Rontzki (2006–2010)
 Rafi Peretz (2010–2016)
 Eyal Karim (2016–)

Japan
 Binyamin Edre'i (2015–present)

Lebanon

 Moïse Yedid-Levy (1799–1829)
 Ralph Alfandari
 Youssef Mann (1849)
 Aharoun Yedid-Levy
 Zaki Cohen (1875)
 Menaché Ezra Sutton
 Jacob Bukai
 Haïm Dana
 Moïse Yedid-Levy
 Nassim Afandi Danon (1908–1909)
 Jacob Tarrab (1910–1921)
 Salomon Tagger (1921–1923)
 Shabtai Bahbout (1924–1950)
 Benzion Lichtman (1932–1959)
 Shahud Chreim (1960–1978)

Luxembourg 

 Robert Serebrenik (1929–1941)

Mexico
 Shlomo Tawil (1998–Present)

North Macedonia
 Avi Kozma

Morocco
 Mardo Chee Bengio Chief Rabbi of Tangier.
 Raphael Ankawa (1918–1935)
 Mikail Encaoua
 Chalom Messas (1961–1978)
 Aaron Monsonego (1994–2018)
 Yoshiyahu Pinto (2019–present)

Nepal
 Chezki Lifshitz (2000–present)

Norway
 Isaak Julius Samuel (1930–1942)
 Michael Melchior (1980–)

Panama
 Zion Levy (1951–2008) Sephardic Chief Rabbi
 Aaron Laine (1986–) Ashkenazi Chief Rabbi
 David Perets (2016–) Sephardic Chief Rabbi

Peru

 Abraham Moshe Brener (1930-1967)
 Baruj Epstein (1966-1967)
 Yaakov Kraus (1987-1998)
 Efraim Zik (1999-2009)
 Itay Meushar (2009-2016)
 Salomon Cohen (2016-2019)

Poland

 Jacob Pollak (appointed 1503)
 Moses Fishel (1541–1542)
 Dow Ber Percowicz (1945–1956)
 Zew Wawa Morejno (1956–1957)
 Dow Ber Percowicz (1957–1961) 
 Uszer Zibes (1961–1966)
 Zew Wawa Morejno (1966–1973)
 Pinchas Menachem Joskowicz (1988–1999)
 Michael Schudrich (2004–)

Poland: Armed Forces
 Chaim Elizjer Frankl (?–1933)
 Major Baruch Steinberg (1933–circa 12 April 1940) murdered by NKVD in the Katyn massacre

Romania
 Yaakov Yitzhak Neimerov (d. 1940)
 Alexandru Safran (1940–1948)
 Moses Rosen (1948–1994)
 Menachem Hacohen (1997–2011)
 Rafael Shaffer (2011–Present)

Russia

 Adolf Shayevich (1983, officially since 1993–)
 Berel Lazar (2000–)

Military Rabbinate 
 Aharon Gurevich (2007–)

Serbia
 Isaac Alcalay, also Chief Rabbi of Yugoslavia from 1923 to 1941
 Isak Asiel

Singapore
 Mordechai Abergel

Slovakia
 Moses Sofer (1806–1839)
 Samuel Benjamin Sofer (1839–1871)
 Simcha Bunim Sofer (1871–1907)
 Akiva Sofer (1907–1938)
 Izidor Katz (1950–1968)
 Baruch Myers (1993–present)

South Africa
 Judah Leo Landau (1915–1942)
 Louis Rabinowitz (1945–1961)
 Bernard M. Casper (1963–1987)
 Cyril Harris (1988–2004)
 Warren Goldstein (2005–)

Spain
 Baruj Garzon (1968–1978), the first Chief Rabbi in Spain since the expulsion in 1492
 Yehuda Benasuli (1978–1997)
 Moshe Bendahan (1997–)

Sudan
 Solomon Malka (1906–1949)
 Haim Simoni (1950–1952)
 Massoud El-Baz (1956-1965 by which time the Jewish community in Sudan had declined so dramatically that they could not afford to pay a Rabbi)

Syria
 Yom Tov Yedid (1960–1982), moved to the United States in 1982 and died 27 July 2016 in the United States

Thailand
 Yosef Kantor (1992–present)

Transylvania (before 1918)
Note: The chief rabbi of Transylvania was generally the rabbi of the city of Alba Iulia.
 Joseph Reis Auerbach (d. 1750)
 Shalom Selig ben Saul Cohen (1754–1757)
 Johanan ben Isaac (1758–1760)
 Benjamin Ze'eb Wolf of Cracow (1764–1777)
 Moses ben Samuel Levi Margaliot (1778–1817)
 Menahem ben Joshua Mendel (1818–23)
 Ezekiel Paneth (1823–1843)
 Abraham Friedmann (d. 1879), last chief rabbi of Transylvania

Tunisia
 Chaim Madar (1984–2004)

Turkey

 Eli Capsali (1452–1454)
 Moses Capsali (1454–1497)
 Elijah Mizrachi (1497–1526)
 Mordechai Komitano (1526–1542)
 Tam ben Yahya (1542–1543)
 Eli Rozanes ha-Levi (1543)
 Eli ben Hayim (1543–1602)
 Yehiel Bashan (1602–1625)
 Joseph Mitrani (1625–1639)
 Yomtov Benyaes (1639–1642)
 Yomtov Hananiah Benyakar (1642–1677)
 Chaim Kamhi (1677–1715)
 Judah Benrey (1715–1717)
 Samuel Levi (1717–1720)
 Abraham Rozanes (1720–1745)
 Solomon Hayim Alfandari (1745–1762)
 Meir Ishaki (1762–1780)
 Eli Palombo (1780–1800)
 Chaim Jacob Benyakar (1800–1835)
 Abraham Levi Pasha (1835–1839)
 Samuel Hayim (1839–1841)
 Moiz Fresko (1841–1854)
 Yacob Avigdor (1854–1870)
 Yakir Geron (1870–1872)
 Moses Levi (1872–1909)
 Chaim Nahum Effendi (1909–1920)
 Shabbetai Levi (1920–1922)
 Isaac Ariel (1922–1926)
 Haim Bejerano (1926–1931)
 Haim Isaac Saki (1931–1940)
 Rafael David Saban (1940–1960)
 David Asseo (1961–2002)
 Ishak Haleva (2003–)

Chabad 

 Mendy Chitrik (2003-present)

Uganda
 Gershom Sizomu (see: Abayudaya)

Ukraine
 Azriel Chaikin (2003–2009)

United Arab Emirates
 Levi Duchman (2015-) first resident rabbi to the UAE, appointed Chabad Shaliach to the UAE in 2020, making him the first Chabad Shaliach in a Gulf country. Directs the Jewish Community Center of the UAE. Rabbi Yehuda Sarna is the current Chief Rabbi of the Jewish Council of the Emirates.

United Kingdom and Commonwealth

Ashkenazi chief rabbis

 Judah Loeb ben Abraham Ephraim Asher Anshel (1696–1700)
 Aaron the Scribe of Dublin (1700–1704)
 Aaron Hart (1704–1756)
 Hart Lyon (1758–1764)
 David Tevele Schiff (1765–1791)
 Solomon Hirschell (1802–1842)
 Nathan Marcus Adler (1845–1891)
 Hermann Adler (1891–1911)
 Joseph Herman Hertz (1913–1946)
 Israel Brodie (1948–1965)
 Immanuel Jakobovits (1966–1991; knighted 1981, life peer 1988)
 Jonathan Sacks (1991–2013; knighted 2005, life peer 2009)
 Ephraim Mirvis (2013–present)

Spanish and Portuguese community Hahamim/senior rabbis
The Sephardi Jews in the United Kingdom are mainly members of independent synagogues. There is no single rabbi recognised by them as a chief rabbi. The Spanish and Portuguese community, however, consists of several synagogues, charities, a beth din and a kashruth authority. These are under the leadership of an ecclesiastical head. Historically, the individual who fills this role is recognised as a senior rabbi of Anglo Jewry, being the leader of the oldest Jewish community in the country. The Senior Rabbi was traditionally given the title, Haham, meaning "wise one". Since 1918, however, only Solomon Gaon was given this title. The official title of the holder of this office is now The Senior Rabbi of the S&P Sephardi Community of the United Kingdom.

 Jacob ben Aaron Sasportas (1664–1665)
 Yehoshua Da Silva (1670–1679)
 Jacob Abendana (1681–1684)
 Solomon Ayllon (1689–1700)
 David Nieto (1701–1728)
 Isaac Nieto (1732–1740)
 Moshe Gomes de Mesquita (1744–1751)
 Moshe Cohen d'Azevedo (1761–1784)
 Raphael Meldola (1806–1828)
 Benjamin Artom (1866–1879)
 Moses Gaster (1887–1918)
 Shem Tob Gaguine (1920–1953) (officially the "Ecclesiastical Chief of the Spanish & Portuguese Jews' Congregation," not the Haham)
 Solomon Gaon (1949–1995)
 Abraham Levy (1995–2012) (officially the Communal Rabbi and Spiritual Head of the Spanish & Portuguese Jews' Congregation, not the haham)
 Joseph Dweck (2013–) (elected Senior Rabbi of The S&P Sephardi Community, not the haham)

United States
A chief rabbinate never truly developed within the United States for a number of different reasons. While Jews first settled in the United States in 1654 in New York City, rabbis did not appear in the United States until the mid-nineteenth century. This lack of rabbis, coupled with the lack of official colonial or state recognition of a particular sect of Judaism as official effectively led to a form of congregationalism amongst American Jews. This did not stop others from trying to create a unified American Judaism, and in fact, some chief rabbis developed in some American cities despite lacking universal recognition amongst the Jewish communities within the cities (for examples see below). However, Jonathan Sarna argues that those two precedents, as well as the desire of many Jewish immigrants to the US to break from an Orthodox past, effectively prevented any effective Chief Rabbi in America.

 Eliezer Silver

Uruguay
 Jaime Spector (1931–1937)
 Aaron Milevsky (1937–1943)
 Aaron Laschover (1943–1967)
 Nechemia Berman (1970–1993)
 Eliahu Birenbaum (1994–1999)
 Yosef Bittón (1999–2002)
 Mordejai Maarabi (2002–2009)
 Shai Froindlich (2009–2010)
 Isaac Fadda (2011–2012)
 Ben-Tzion Spitz (2013–2016)
 Max Yojanan Godet (2017–present)

Uzbekistan
 Baruch Abramchayev

Venezuela

Sephardi
 Isaac Cohen

Ashkenazi
 Pynchas Brener (1967–)

By city

Amsterdam, Netherlands

Ashkenazi
 Aryeh Leib ben Saul 1740–1755
 Saul Lowenstam 
 B.S. Berenstein
 Dr Joseph Hirsch Dünner
 Abraham S. Onderwijzer
 L.H. Sarlouis
 Justus Tal
 Aron Schuster
 Meir Just 1970–1978
 Aryeh Ralbag (2008–2016)
 Pinchas Toledano (2016–current)

Sephardi
 Menasseh Ben Israel
 Dr Benjamin Israel Ricardo
 Dr Pinchas Toledano (2012–)

Antwerp, Belgium
 Chaim Kreiswirth (1953–2001)

Baltimore, Maryland – United States
 Abraham N. Schwartz (d. 1937)
 Joseph H. Feldman (retired 1972, d. 1992)

Birobidzhan, Russia
 Mordechai Scheiner (2002–2020)
 Efraim Kolpak (2020-present)

Budapest, Hungary
 Yonasan Steif (pre-World War II)

Caracas, Venezuela

Ashkenazi
 Pynchas Brener (1967–present)

Sephardi
 Isaac Cohén (–)

Chicago, Illinois – United States
 Yaakov Dovid Wilovsky known as the Ridbaz, served as chief rabbi of the Russian-American congregations in the city 1903–1905.

Copenhagen, Denmark
 David Simonsen (1879–1891)
 Elias Kalischer
 Hirsch Goitein (–1903)
 Max Schornstein (1906–1910)
 Bent Melchior (1963–1970)
 Jacob Garfinkel (1971–1973)

Frankfurt, Germany
 Menachem Halevi Klein|Menachem Klein
 Nathan HaKohen Adler

Gateshead, United Kingdom
 Shraga Feivel Zimmerman

The Hague, Netherlands
 Saul Isaac Halevi (1748–1785)
 Tobias Tal (1895–1898)
 Dov Yehuda Schochet (1946–1952)

Haifa, Israel

Ashkenazi
 She'ar Yashuv Cohen (1927–2016)

Sephardi
 Eliyahu Bakshi-Doron (1993–2003)

Hannover, Germany
 Samuel Freund (1924-1939)
 Chaim Pinchas Lubinsky (1946-1949)
 Shlomo Zev Zweigenhaft (1949-1952)

Hebron, West Bank
 Chaim Hezekiah Medini (1891–1904)
 Dov Lior – present

Helsinki, Finland
 Naftali Amsterdam (1867–1875)
 Avrohom Schain (1876–1881)
 Abraham Werner-Homa (1881–1891)
 Shmuel Noson Bukantz (1892–1924)
 Scholem Triestman (1928–1929)

Hoboken, New Jersey – United States
 Chaim Hirschensohn (1904–1935). His post included Hoboken, Jersey City, Union Hill and the Environs.

Jerusalem

Sephardi
 Levi Ibn Habib 
 David Ibn Abi Zimra
 Moshe Galante I
 Haim Vital
 Betzalel Ashkenasi
 Gedalia Cordovero
 Isaac Gaon
 Israel Benjamin
 Yaacov Tzemah
 Shemuel Garmison
 Moshe Galante II (1665–1689)
 Moshe Ibn Habib (1689–1696)
 Moshe Hayun
 Abraham ben David Yitzchaki (1715–1722)
 Binyamin Maali
 Elazar ben Yaacob Nahum (1730–1748)
 Nissim Mizrahi (1748–1754)
 Israel Yaacob Algazy (1754–1756)
 Raphael Samuel Meyuchas (1756–1791)
 Haim Raphael Abraham ben Asher (1771–1772)
 Yom Tov Algazy (1772–1802)
 Moshe Yosef Mordechai Meyuchas (1802–1805)
 Yaacob Moshe Ayash al-Maghrebi (1806–1817)
 Jacob Coral (1817–1819)
 Raphael Yosef Hazzan (1819–1822)
 Yom Tov Danon (1822–1824)
 Salomon Moshe Suzin (1824–1836)
 Yonah Moshe Navon (1836–1841)
 Yehudah Raphael Navon (1841–1842)
 Haim Abraham Gagin (1842–1848)
 Isaac Kovo (1848–1854)
 Haim Nissim Abulafia (1854–1861)
 Haim David Hazan (1861–1869)
 Abraham Ashkenasi (1869–1880)
 Raphael Meir Panigel (1880–1892)
 Yaacob Shaul Elyashar (1893–1906)
 Yaacob Meir (1906) 
 Eliyah Moshe Panigel (1907–1909)
 Nahman Batito (1909–1911)
 Moshe Franco (1911–1915)
 Haim Moshe Elyashar (1914–1915)
 Nissim Yehudah Danon (1915–1921)
 Yaacob Meir (1921–1939)
 Chalom Messas (1978–2003)
 Shlomo Amar (2014–)

Ashkenazi
 Meir Auerbach (?–1878)
 Shmuel Salant (1878–1909)
 Chaim Berlin (1909–1912?)

 Abraham Isaac Kook (1919–1935)
 Tzvi Pesach Frank (1936–?)

 Betzalel Zolty (1977–?)
 Yitzhak Kolitz (1983–2002)
 Aryeh Stern (2014–)

Edah HaChareidis
Note: The Edah HaChareidis is unaffiliated with the State of Israel. It is a separate, independent religious community with its own Chief Rabbis, who are viewed, in the Haredi world, as being the Chief Rabbis of Jerusalem.
 Yosef Chaim Sonnenfeld (1919–1932)
 Yosef Tzvi Dushinsky (1932–1948)
 Zelig Reuven Bengis (1948–1953)
 Joel Teitelbaum of Satmar (1953–1979)
 Yitzchok Yaakov Weiss (1979–1989)
 Moshe Aryeh Freund (1989–1996)
 Yisrael Moshe Dushinsky (1996–2002)
 Yitzchok Tuvia Weiss (2002–)

Kyiv, Ukraine
 Jonathan Markovitch (2000 – present)

Krakow, Poland
 Boaz Pash (2006–2012)
 Eliezer Gurary (2014–present)

Leiden, Netherlands
 Simon de Vries

Leeuwarden, Friesland, Netherlands
  (1821–1836)
  (1840–1886)
  (1886–1895)
 Tobias Lewenstein (1895–1899)
  (1900–1918)
  (1924–1927)
  (1929–1932)
  (1935–1945)

Milan, Italy
 Avraham David Shaumann
 Elia Kopciovsky (195?–1980)
 Giuseppe Laras (1980–2005)
 Alfonso Arbib (2005–)

Modi'in Illit, Israel
 Meir Kessler

Montreal, Quebec, Canada

Ashkenazi
 Zvi Hirsch Cohen (1922–1950)
 Sheea Herschorn (1951–1961)
 Pinchas Hirschprung (1969–1998)
 Avraham David Niznik (1998–2006)
 Binyomin Weiss (2006–Present)

Sephardi
 David Sabbah

Moscow, Russia
 Yakov Maze (prior to 1924–1933)
 Shmaryahu Yehudah Leib Medalia (1933–1938)
 Shmuel Leib Medalia (1943)
 Shmuel Leib Levin (1943–1944)
 Shlomo Shleifer (1944–1957)
 Yehuda Leib Levin (1957–1971)
 Adolf Shayevich (1983, officially since 1993–)
 Pinchas Goldschmidt (1987–2022)

Munich, Germany
 Yitshak Ehrenberg (1989–1997)
 Pinchos Biberfeld, moved back to Germany from where he had emigrated to Israel over 50 years earlier. (1980–1999)
 Steven Langnas, first German (descendance) Chief Rabbi and Av Beth Din of Munich (1999–2011)

Netherlands – Inter-Provincial Chief rabbinate
 Dov Yehuda Schochet (1946–1952) [Chief Rabbi of The Hague]
 Elieser Berlinger (1960–1985)
 Binyomin Jacobs (2008–recent)

New York, New York – United States
 Jacob Joseph (1840–1902) was the only true Ashkenazi chief rabbi of New York City; there was never a Sephardi chief rabbi, although Dr. David DeSola Pool acted as a leader among the Sepharadim and was also respected as such. Others it has been said claimed the title of Chief Rabbi; eventually, the title became worthless through dilution.
 Chaim Jacob Wiedrewitz was the Chassidic chief rabbi of New York and Pennsylvania; he was previously the Chassidic Rav of Moscow and was officially called as "The Moskover Rav", immigrated in 1893 and died in 1911, he's buried in the Chabad society of the Bayside Cemetery in Ozone Park NY.
 Jacob S. Kassin was the Chief Rabbi of the Syrian Jewish community of New York 1930–1995.
 Leibish Wolowsky was the chief rabbi of the Galician community of NYC 1888–1913, he was previously the rabbi of Sambor, Austria and immigrated to the US in 1888. He died in 1913 and is buried in the Achum Ahuvim of Reizow at the Mount Zion Cemetery in Maspeth NY.
 Avrohom Aharon Yudelevitz who was previously the rav of Manchester, England was accepted in 1919 as the chief rabbi of the Jewish Arbitration Court of NYC, he authored many books on Jewish law and Responsa. He died in 1930 and is buried in family plot at the Bayside cemetery in Ozone Park NY.

Nové Zámky, Slovakia
 Ernest Klein (1931–1944)

Paris, France
 Michel Seligmann (1809–1829)
 Marchand Ennery (1829–1845) 
 Lazard Isidor (1847–1865) 
 Zadoc Kahn (1866–1889) 
 Jacques-Henri Dreyfuss (1891–1933) 
 Julien Weill (1933–1950) 
 Jacob Kaplan (1950–1955) 
 Meïr Jaïs (1956–1980) 
 Alain Goldmann (1980–1994) 
 David Messas (1994–2011) 
 Michel Gugenheim (2012– )

Rome, Italy
 Israel Zolli (1940–1945)
 Elio Toaff (1951–2002)
 Riccardo Di Segni (2002–)

Rotterdam, Netherlands
 Josiah Pardo (1648–1669) See his Haskama – Approbation to Sefer Nachalat Shiva, edition Amsterdam 1667, where he is mentioned as Chief Rabbi of both the Sephardi and Ashkenazi congregations in Rotterdam
 Yosia Pardo (1648–1669). Left in 1669 to Amsterdam.
 Yuda Loeb ben Rabbi Shlomo (1674-abt. 1700). Born in Wilna.
 Judah Salomon (1682)
 Judah Loeb ben Abraham Ephraim Asher Anshel (1700–1708) Born in Hamburg, left for Amsterdam.
 Solomon Ezekiel (1725–1735)
 Judah Ezekiel (1738–1755)
 Abraham Ezekiel (1755–79)
 Aryeh Leib Breslau (1741–1809)
 Judah Akiba Eger son of Akiba Eger I (invited but refused position)
 Elijah Casriel (1815–1833)
 E.J. Löwenstamm (1834–1845)
 Joseph Isaacsohn (1850–1871; one of three sons-in-law of Jacob Ettlinger who were Chief Rabbis in the Netherlands)
 Bernhard Löbel Ritter (1885–1928)
 Simon Hirsch (1928–1930)
 Aaron Davids (1930–1944)
 Justus Tal (1945–1954)
 Salomon Rodrigues Pereira (1954–1959)
 Levie Vorst (1959–1971)
 Daniel Kahn (1972–1975)
 Albert Hutterer (1975–1977)
 Dov Salzmann (1986–1988)
 Lody van de Kamp
 Raphael Evers

Shanghai, China
 Meir Ashkenazi (1926–1949)

Sofia, Bulgaria
 Daniel Zion (in World War II)
 Asher Hannanel (in World War II)

St. Louis, Missouri – United States
 Chaim Fischel Epstein
 Menachem Zvi Eichenstein (1943–1982)
 Sholom Rivkin (1983–2011)

Tel Aviv-Yafo, Israel

Sephardi
 Ben-Zion Meir Hai Uziel (1911–1939)
 Ya'akov Moshe Toledano (1942–1960)
 Ovadia Yosef (1968–1973)
 Hayim David HaLevi (1973–1998?)

Toronto, Ontario, Canada
 Joseph Weinreb 1900–1942
 Avraham Aharon Price
 Gedaliah Felder

Vienna, Austria
 Yitshak Ehrenberg (1983–1989)
 Akiva Eisenberg
 Paul Chaim Eisenberg
 Arie Folger

Warsaw, Poland
 Pinchas Menachem Joskowicz (1988–1999)
 Baruch Rabinowitz (1999–2000)
 Michael Schudrich (2000–)

Würzburg, Germany
 Abraham Bing (1814–1839)

Zagreb, Croatia
 Hosea Jacobi (1880–1925)
 Miroslav Šalom Freiberger (1941–1943)

"Grand Rabbi"
Occasionally, the term "Grand Rabbi" is used to note a Hasidic Rebbe, particularly used on letterhead when the letterhead is in English.

See also
 Grand Mufti
 Kohanim
 Rishamma
 Samaritan High Priest

References

External links

 
 Office of the Chief Rabbi in London, England
 Chief Rabbinate of Israel 

Orthodox rabbinic roles and titles